María Teresa de Vega is a Spanish writer and poet. She has been included within the Generation 21 group of writers.

Biography
María Teresa de Vega was born in San Cristóbal de La Laguna, Tenerife. She is the daughter of writer Isaac de Vega who was part of the Fetasiano group.

She earned a licentiate in Romance Philology at the University of La Laguna. A few years at the School of Fine Arts of Santa Cruz de Tenerife contributed to her training. 

She has been a Spanish Language and Literature teacher at teaching centers in Tenerife and Madrid.

She has published four poetry collections – Perdonen que hoy no esté jovial (2001), Cerca de lo lejano (2006), Mar cifrado (2009), and Necesidad de Orfeo (2015); two books of short stories – Perdidos en las redes (2000) and Sociedad sapiens (2005); and three novels – Niebla solar (2009), Merodeadores de orilla (2012), and Divisa de las hojas (2014).

The prose of María Teresa de la Vega has been characterized by the writer and literature professor Damián H. Estévez as "poetic, essentially lyrical and narrative in the essentials. Because it is so important for the composition of the characters, events that happen to them, the conversations that they hold, like the introspection to which the author invites us through her style." The writer and critic Daniel María said of Merodeadores de orilla: "The novel contains passages that include the essay and the philosophical dissertation, and passages that involve the poetic prose of a surrealizing impulse."

Her work Divisa de las hojas was selected for the Santa Cruz city reading project. She has participated in the cycle Entre palabras.

Publications

Novels
 Niebla solar (2009), Editorial Baile del sol, 
 Merodeadores de orilla (2012), Ediciones Aguere-Idea, 
 Divisa de las hojas (2014), Ediciones Aguere-Idea, 
 El doble oscuro (2018), Ediciones Nace,

Short story collections
 Perdidos en las redes (2000), Editorial Benchomo
 Sociedad sapiens (2005), Editorial Baile del sol,

Poetry collections
 Perdonen que hoy no esté jovial (2001), Editorial Benchomo, 
 Cerca de lo lejano (2006), Editorial Benchomo
 Mar cifrado (2009), Ediciones Idea, 
 Necesidad de Orfeo (2015), Escritura entre las nubes,

References

External links
 

Living people
21st-century Spanish poets
21st-century Spanish women writers
People from San Cristóbal de La Laguna
Spanish women novelists
Spanish women poets
Year of birth missing (living people)
Writers from the Canary Islands